Juan José Espinosa San Martín (30 June 1918 – 14 January 1982) was a Spanish politician who served as Minister of Finance of Spain between 1965 and 1969, during the Francoist dictatorship.

References

1918 births
1982 deaths
Economy and finance ministers of Spain
Government ministers during the Francoist dictatorship